Madelene Nordlund is a Paralympic athlete from Sweden competing mainly in category T53 100m to 800m events.

Nordlund first competed in a Summer Paralympics in Sydney in 2000 winning two silver medals in the T53 200m and 800m. Four years later Nordlund competed at the 2004 Summer Paralympics winning a silver medal in the 400m and a bronze medal in the 800m. In Beijing in the 2008 Summer Paralympics she competed in the 1000m, 200m, 400m and 800m but could not add to her medal tally.

References

Paralympic athletes of Sweden
Athletes (track and field) at the 2000 Summer Paralympics
Athletes (track and field) at the 2004 Summer Paralympics
Athletes (track and field) at the 2008 Summer Paralympics
Paralympic silver medalists for Sweden
Paralympic bronze medalists for Sweden
Living people
Medalists at the 2000 Summer Paralympics
Medalists at the 2004 Summer Paralympics
Swedish wheelchair racers
Year of birth missing (living people)
Paralympic medalists in athletics (track and field)
21st-century Swedish people